Enolmis sierraenevadae is a moth of the family Scythrididae. It was described by Pietro Passerin d'Entrèves in 1997. It is found in Spain (Sierra Nevada).

References

Scythrididae
Moths described in 1997